Fort Nashwaak (also known as Fort Naxoat, Fort St. Joseph) was the capital of Acadia and is now a National Historic Site of Canada in present-day Fredericton, New Brunswick, Canada.  It was located strategically up the Saint John River and close to the native village of Fort Meductic for military purposes.

The fort was built during King William's War following the defeat of the capital of Acadia at Port Royal. In 1691-1692, Governor of Acadia Joseph de Villebon built Fort Nashwaak at Nashwaaksis on the north side of the Saint John River at the mouth of the Nashwaak River. It replaced Fort Jemseg (which had replaced Port Royal) as the capital of Acadia.

After Claude-Sébastien de Villieu's successful Raid on Oyster River on the New England frontier, he joined Governor de Villebon as the commander of Fort Nashwaak.  From Fort Nashwaak, they executed numerous raids on the New England border with Acadia, aided by their Abenaki and other First Nations allies.  The Governor and his forces were involved in the Raid on Oyster River.  His most significant success was the Siege of Pemaquid (1696).  He benefited greatly from the support of Frontenac in his endeavours. In retaliation, in 1696 the British made an attempted siege of the capital. After de Villebon's death in 1700 and a devastating flood, the fort was abandoned.

The site of the former fort was designated a National Historic Site in 1924.

See also 
Military history of Nova Scotia

References
Texts
 John Clarence Webster. Fort Nashwaak, at Our Roots, Canadian Local Histories Online
 Clarke. Too Small a World: The Story of Acadia. Fort St. Joseph, Our Roots, Canadian Local Histories, full text online

Endnotes

Military forts in Acadia
Military history of Acadia
Military forts in New Brunswick
National Historic Sites in New Brunswick
Fredericton
Forts or trading posts on the National Historic Sites of Canada register
Canadian Register of Historic Places in New Brunswick